Quercus motuoensis is an uncommon Asian species of trees in the beech family Fagaceae. It has been found only in Tibet.  It is placed in subgenus Cerris, section Cyclobalanopsis.

Quercus motuoensis is a large tree up to 30 meters tall. Leaves can be as much as 10 cm long.

References

External links
line drawing, Flora of China Illustrations vol. 4, fig. 379, drawings 1-3 at lower left

motuoensis
Flora of Tibet
Plants described in 1992